Prussian nationalism, known more recently as Kaliningrad separatism, is the nationalism that asserted that Prussians were a nation and promoted the cultural unity of Prussians. Prussian nationalism arose as a result of the state-building by the Hohenzollern dynasty that was initiated with the merger of Brandenburg with East Prussia in the 16th century followed later by the incorporation of West Prussia, Pomerania, Silesia, and large portions of the Rhineland and Westphalia by the 19th century. Prussian nationalism has ceased with Prussia becoming non-existent in post-World War II period.

Prussian nationalism was influential in several military conflicts: the Second Schleswig War in 1864, the Austro-Prussian War in 1866, and the Franco-Prussian War in 1870; with Prussian nationalist sentiment emphasizing Protestant triumphalism. In 1871, Prussia led the unification of Germany into the German Empire in which the German Emperor was also the King of Prussia. The state of Germany as manifested in the German Empire created by the Prussian government of Otto von Bismarck, drew criticisms by German nationalists like Konstantin Franz who accused Bismarck of creating a federal state based on Prussian nationalist goals and a deviation from German nationalism.

In 2017, the remaining Germans along with Russian opposition in the Kaliningrad Oblast, which is the new Russian oblast in what was once East Prussia, would begin to protest and demand independence.

See also
 Brandenburg
 East Prussia
 Kaliningrad
 Prussia
 Related nationalisms
 German nationalism
 Polish nationalism
 West Prussia

References

Further reading
 

Nationalist movements in Europe